Longchambon is a French surname. Notable people with the surname include:

 Henri Longchambon (1896–1969), French politician and scientist
 Samia Longchambon (born 1982), English actress
 Sylvain Longchambon (born 1980), French ice dancer

French-language surnames